Lando Fiorini (born Leopoldo Fiorini; 27 January 1938 – 9 December 2017) was an Italian actor and singer, known primarily for having sung folk songs from Rome in Italian and Romanesco.  

His career started in 1961, when he took part to the musical festival Cantagiro and was noted by the duo of playwrights Garinei & Giovannini, who chose him for the role of the cantastorie in the successful musical Rugantino. He was the founder and artistic director of a cabaret nightclub, Puff, where he launched the career of several comedians, notably Lino Banfi, Enrico Montesano and Leo Gullotta.  

His cabaret show, Ma ‘ndo vai se il decoder non-ce l’hai, satirized Italian television.

Discography
1963 —  Rugantino
1964 —  Roma Mia
1966 —  Passeggiate romane
1970 —  E questo amore
1971 —  Bella quanno te fece mamma tua
1972 —  Roma ieri e oggi
1974 —  Roma ruffiana
1975 —  A Roma è sempre primavera
1976 — Passa la serenata / Una preghiera per Roma sparita
1977 — Forza Roma 
1977 — Co’ amore e co’ rabbia
1982 — Mozzichi e baci
1982 — Amore giallorosso
1984 — Souvenir di Roma / Momenti d’amore
1985 — Tra i sogni e la vita
1986 — Le più belle canzoni romane
1991 — E adesso l’amore
1993 — Puff…Lando ed altri successi
1995 — Una voce… una città
1996 — Ci sarà pure un grande amore
2000 — Roma, un sogno dentro una canzone
2001 — Forza Roma
2002 — Favole, sonetti di Trilussa e canzoni di Lando Fiorini
2002 — Tra le gente
2005 — Come se po’ spiega’ cos’è l’amore – Edizione Platinum
2005 — Così è la Vita
2007 — 100 Campane 100 Canzoni
 2010 — Ti presento Roma mia

References

External links

Official Website of Lando Fiorini.  In Italian

1938 births
2017 deaths
21st-century Italian  male singers
20th-century Italian male  singers
20th-century Italian male actors
Musicians from Rome
Place of birth missing
Place of death missing